Francisco Bustamante (born December 29, 1963) is a Filipino professional pool player from Tarlac, Central Luzon and the 2010 World Nine-ball Champion, nicknamed "Django", after the lead character of the 1966 film of the same name, and sometimes also called "Bustie", especially in the United States. Bustamante has won over 70 International titles.

Early life
Bustamante is the youngest of eight siblings. He picked up the nickname "Django" because his character and his appearance with a cigarette in his mouth was reminiscent of the movie character of that name. His father made a living through building toilets and planting rice, and Bustamante also worked in these activities. He began working in his sister's pool hall, racking and spotting balls on the tables, and practising alone on the tables after the hall had closed.

Bustamante never completed high school and concentrated on pocket billiards from 10 years of age. After some success in the Philippines, Bustamante moved to Germany where he stayed for over ten years, competing in a number of tournaments in Europe.

Professional career
Bustamante has won titles including the Munich Masters, the German Nine-ball Championship, and the All Japan Championship.
With his win in Tulsa, Bustamante became champion of the 1998 Camel Pro Billiards Series year-long point fund. He then finished the season by winning the Columbus 10-Ball Open and becoming the first player to win three Camel titles in one season. His Columbus 10-Ball title completed the first ever Camel trifecta, with titles in each of the three games contested on the Camel Pro Billiards Series: eight-ball, nine-ball and ten-ball. Known for his flamboyant style at the table and behind-the-back shots, Bustamante also holds the world record for having the most powerful break shot.

In 1999, Bustamante finished third in the WPA World Nine-ball Championship after losing to Efren Reyes, who went on to win. A few months later he won the International Challenge of Champions. He won that tournament again three years later.

The next year, Bustamante won the Motolite 9-ball Tournament, an event held in the Philippines, beating Antonio Lining. The victory prize was $30,000, the largest first prize offered in a Philippine-held tournament at that time.

In 2002, Bustamante received a phone call from his wife during the World Pool Championships, informing him that his daughter, who was less than a year old, had died. Bustamante considered forfeiting his contention at the tournament to return to the Philippines, but some people around including fellow countryman Efren Reyes convinced him to go on. 
On his way to the final, Bustamante beat Antonio Lining in the last 16, Efren Reyes in the quarter finals, and Ching Shun Yang in the semis. In the final, he met Earl Strickland, twice winner of the tournament. After leading for most of the match, Bustamante lost the match 17–15.

Bustamante won the Peninsula Nine-ball Open, Gabriel's Las Vegas International Nine-ball tournament, the IBC Tokyo Nine-ball International, and the All Japan Nine-ball Championship. He also won the Sudden Death Seven-ball tournament, dedicating the victory to his daughter. With this string of victories, he became the AZBilliards 2002 Player of the Year.
 
Bustamante won the World Pool League in 2004, defeating world nine-ball champion Alex Pagulayan. He reached the finals of that event in 2001 but was beaten by Steve Knight.

In 2007, he was undefeated in the United States Pro Tour Championship held at the Normandie Casino in Los Angeles, California.

For 2007, he was ranked #7 in Pool & Billiard Magazine's "Fans' Top 20 Favorite Players" poll.

He competed in the 2008 WPA World Straight Pool Championship where he finished second behind Niels Feijen, becoming the only Filipino player to reach the finals of the event.

In 2010, Bustamante again reached the finals of the World Nine-ball Championship, winning the match and the title against Taiwan's Kuo Po-cheng.

On July 27, 2010, Francisco Bustamante, along with Terry Bell and Larry Hubbart, founders of the American Pool Players Association (APA), were elected to the Billiard Congress of America Hall of Fame, and inducted on October 21, 2010. Bustamante was the second player from the Philippines to be inducted, after Efren Reyes.

Titles and Achievements

References

External links
Francisco Bustamante Matches
Francisco Bustamante on cover of Inside Pool Magazine 
Francisco Bustamante image gallery at Inside Pool Magazine
Inside Pool Magazine Interview with Francisco Bustamante at Derby City Classic

1963 births
Filipino pool players
Living people
Sportspeople from Tarlac
Place of birth missing (living people)
World champions in pool
Asian Games medalists in cue sports
Cue sports players at the 2002 Asian Games
Asian Games gold medalists for the Philippines
Medalists at the 2002 Asian Games
WPA World Nine-ball Champions
Recipients of the Presidential Medal of Merit (Philippines)